Salif Diao-Jimenez (born 27 October 1990) is a Dutch footballer who plays for Dutch side VV Bolnes.

His cousin, also called Salif Diao, was a professional footballer with Liverpool.

Club career
Diao made his professional debut for Eerste Divisie outfit FC Dordrecht in December 2010 against RBC. He was loaned to FC Oss in January 2013.

He left VV Capelle in summer 2015 for SV Bolnes.

References

External links
 Profile at Voetbal International

1990 births
Living people
Footballers from Rotterdam
Association football defenders
Dutch footballers
Stoke City F.C. players
Austin Aztex FC players
FC Dordrecht players
TOP Oss players
VV Capelle players
Eerste Divisie players